In typography (specifically Typeface anatomy), a stroke can end in a number of ways.  Examples include:
 The serif, including:
 The regular serif
 The bracketed serif
 The half-serif
 The terminal, which is any stroke that does not end in a serif
 The , a tapered or curved end
 The , an extended or decorative flourish that replaces a serif or terminal on a letter
 The  (or teardrop), as found in Caslon, Galliard, and Baskerville
 The , as found in Bodoni and Clarendon
 The , a sharp spur, as found in Perpetua, Pontifex, and Ignatius. Also defined as the triangular serifs on the straight lines of capitals like E, F and Z.
 Hooked
 Pear-shaped

References

Typography